Stefanoffia is a genus of flowering plants belonging to the family Apiaceae.

It is native to Bulgaria and Greece in southeastern Europe and in Turkey.

The genus name of Stefanoffia is in honour of Boris Stefanoff (1894–1979), a Bulgarian botanist and curator at the herbarium of Sofia University. 
It was first described and published in Notizbl. Bot. Gart. Berlin-Dahlem Vol.9 on page 282 in 1925.

Known species, according to Kew:
Stefanoffia daucoides 
Stefanoffia insoluta

References

Apioideae
Plants described in 1925
Flora of Bulgaria
Flora of Greece
Apioideae genera